Steve Randall Allen, born 1954, is an American painter. Mr. Allen is known for his work as the Official Artist of the United States Olympic & Paralympic Committee, beginning with the 1996 Summer Olympics.  In August 2021, Mr. Allen began a multi-million dollar initiative to donate selected artworks to Historically Black Colleges and Universities.

References

1954 births
African-American painters
Living people
21st-century African-American people
20th-century African-American people
People from Lillington, North Carolina